"Until We Say Goodbye" is a single by guitarist Joe Satriani, released in 2000 through Epic Records. It is an instrumental track from his eighth studio album Engines of Creation, and was nominated for Best Rock Instrumental Performance at the 2001 Grammys.

Track listing

References

Joe Satriani songs
2000 songs
Rock instrumentals
2000 singles
Epic Records singles
Song recordings produced by Kevin Shirley